Evan Beard is an American entrepreneur, engineer, and co-founder with Ashton Kutcher of the media company A Plus (aplus.com). A Plus ranks among the largest websites in the US, with 30 to 50 million monthly unique visitors, and six months after launch was the fastest growing website in comScore's Mobile Metrix database. Beard has been recognized on the Forbes "30 under 30" list which features the "brightest young entrepreneurs, breakout talents and change agents" and Business Insider's list of the "most inspiring and influential people in New York tech". Prior to A Plus, Beard co-founded Etacts and ArmorHub, both acquired by publicly traded companies.

Early life 
Beard attended Duke University, where he studied computer science and graduated with distinction in economics in 2009. While finishing school he wrote a widely distributed iOS app, “Girlfriend Keeper”, which attracted attention from international media, including Good Morning America, the LA Times, Cosmopolitan Magazine, and local news and radio stations. The app asked for details about one's significant other and sent automated emails and text messages expressing affection, such as "it's only 67 days until your birthday, I might get you something green like your eyes".

Career

Etacts 
In 2009, shortly after graduating college, Beard co-founded Etacts and was admitted to the Y-Combinator seed accelerator. Etacts was a relationship management app that provided a unified view of one's contacts and all emails, calls, and texts with them. It allowed setting reminders on one’s contacts to remember to stay in touch with them. It also provided a contextual widget within Gmail that automatically showed biographical details next to emails, such as the education and work history of your correspondents. The company raised $700,000 from prominent angel investors, including Ron Conway and Ashton Kutcher. In 2010, Etacts was acquired by Salesforce.com, where Beard subsequently worked in engineering as a Senior Member of Technical Staff.

ArmorHub 
In 2011, Beard co-founded Gridtech Inc which created ArmorHub.com. ArmorHub is an app that allows businesses to quickly scan their websites for application-level security vulnerabilities such as SQL Injection and Cross-Site Scripting. ArmorHub was acquired by Spirent Communications, a publicly traded British company.

A Plus 
In 2013, Beard moved to Los Angeles to co-found A Plus with Ashton Kutcher and Kendall Dabaghi. A Plus is a technology-focused media company that creates positive journalism for millennials and uses its own technology for content creation, optimization and distribution. After a soft launch in early 2014, A Plus grew to 50 million unique visitors per month and six months after launch was the fastest growing site in comScore’s Mobile Metrix database. The site raised $3.5m from investors in 2015 and expects $8 million in revenue in 2016. A Plus started in Kutcher’s living room and moved to New York City in 2014.

References

Living people
1986 births
American business executives